Professional tournaments in table-top cue sports took place in 2020. These events include snooker, pool disciplines and billiards. Whilst these are traditionally singles sports, some matches and tournaments are held as doubles or as teams. The snooker season runs between May and April, whilst the pool and billiards seasons is listed over the calendar year. Due to the COVID-19 pandemic, the season was disrupted with many events being cancelled or postponed. Cue sports events were played in January and February, before tournaments were discontinued for all disciplines due to the pandemic, returning in June without an audience.

Ronnie O'Sullivan won the only professional world championship held during the year, the World Snooker Championship. The other Triple Crown events, the UK Championship and Masters, were won by Neil Robertson and Stuart Bingham, respectively. The only major pool tournament held during the year was the Mosconi Cup, won by the European team.

Pool
The cue sport pool encompasses several disciplines, such as straight pool and nine-ball. Events such as the WPA World Nine-ball Championship, World Pool Masters, and the World Cup of Pool, were all postponed to the following year due to the COVID-19 pandemic. The Mosconi Cup, contested between select teams from the US and Europe was played in December.

Euro Tour
The Euro Tour is a professional nine-ball series run across Europe by the European Pocket Billiard Federation. There was just one event, the Treviso Open, with tournaments for both men and women. For the list now, (m) refers to the men's event and (f) to the women's tournament.

Billiards

World Billiards events
Two World Billiards events were played in 2020, the remaining devices were postponed or cancelled.

Three-Cushion World Cup
The Three-Cushion World Cup traditionally played over several events had a single tournament in 2020.

Snooker

The World Snooker Tour generally begins in July and ends in May, however due to the COVID-19 pandemic, the 2019–20 snooker season ended in August, whereas the 2020–21 snooker season began in September. Ronnie O'Sullivan won his sixth World Snooker Championship, defeating Kyren Wilson in the final.

Snooker world rankings

Non-ranking events

Challenge Tour

The Challenge Tour is a secondary non-professional snooker tour with events for invited players. The final four events of the 2019–20 Challenge Tour were played during 2020.

World Seniors Tour

The World Seniors Tour is an amateur series open to players aged 40 and over. There was a single event in the 2020 World Seniors Tour.

Women's events
The women's tour is an amateur tour, with one event held in Belgium during 2020.

Amateur events
The English Amateur Championship was played in 2020, the hundredth staging of the event.

References

External links
 World Pool Association Official Website
 World Billiards Official Website
 World Snooker Official Website

 
Cue sports by year
2020 sport-related lists